The following lists events that happened during 1983 in Singapore.

Incumbents
 President: C. V. Devan Nair
 Prime Minister: Lee Kuan Yew

Events

January
1 January – The Trade Development Board is formed to promote trade, taking over the Timber Industry Board and the Department of Trade with responsibility for domestic trading of commodities handled by the Domestic Trade Section of the Ministry of Trade and Industry, and metrication taken over by the Singapore Institute of Standards and Industrial Research.
29 January – A disaster occurred on the Singapore Cable Car. As a result, 2 cable cars plunged, causing 7 fatalities.

March
 16 March – Two Chinese newspapers, the Nanyang Siang Pau and Sin Chew Jit Poh merged to become Lianhe Zaobao and Lianhe Wanbao.

April
 3 April – Trans-Island Bus Services starts operations as the second bus operator in Singapore, after the bus mergers of 1971 and 1974.Therefore, TIBS was renamed and reoperated as SMRT Buses in May 10, 2004.

May
 28 May – 6 June - Singapore hosts the 12th Southeast Asian Games. It clinched fourth place with a total of 134 medals.

July
 11 July – Fandi Ahmad signs for FC Groningen.
 23 July - National Service conscript Sek Kim Wah and his accomplice Nyu Kok Meng went to rob a rich businessman and his family who lived in Andrew Road. Sek murdered three of the victims (which included the businessman, his wife and the family maid), with the remaining two hostages (the businessman's young daughter and the girl's tuition teacher) being released by Nyu, who protected them from Sek's murderous rampage, which would make headlines nationwide and brought shock to Singaporeans in 1983. Sek, who was also involved in an unrelated double murder that occurred a month earlier, was later arrested and sentenced to death for the five murders. Nyu, who turned himself in, was subsequently incarcerated for life and caned 6 strokes for armed robbery after the prosecution decided to dismiss the murder charges against him since he did not partake in the killings Sek committed. Sek was eventually hanged in Changi Prison Complex on 9 December 1988.

August
1 August – The Singapore Broadcasting Corporation launches SBCtext on SBC 5 and SBC 8.

September
9 September – The Community Chest of Singapore is launched by Ee Peng Liang. This is followed by the start of fund-raising efforts two days later.
16 September – Mitsukoshi Garden reopens as CN West Leisure Park.

October
22 October – The first phase of the MRT system starts construction.

December
3 December – David Bowie and his band visit Singapore as part of the 1983 Serious Moonlight Tour.
30 December – NOL's new building is officially opened.

Date unknown
 100plus, a sports drink was launched to commemorate F&N's 100th anniversary.

Births
 19 January – Sylvester Sim, Singer, runner-up of Singapore Idol (Season 1).
 31 January – Maia Lee, Singer, contestant of Singapore Idol (Season 1).
 11 March – Kate Pang, Actress.
 25 April – Joanne Peh, Actress.
 16 June – He Ting Ru, Politician.
 11 July - Kelly Poon,  Singer. 
 18 August – Tay Kewei, Singer.
 23 December – Tin Pei Ling, Politician.

Deaths
 16 February – Wong Lin Ken, former Minister for Home Affairs (b. 1931).
 23 March – Han Hoe Lim, physician and politician (b. 1894).
 30 June – Choo Seng Quee, footballer (b. 1914).
 1 July – Cheong Soo Pieng, artist (b. 1917).
 14 October – Hon Sui Sen, former Minister for Finance (b. 1916).

References

 
Singapore
Years in Singapore